Ocobamba District may refer to:

 Ocobamba District, Chincheros
 Ocobamba District, La Convención